The Prinz Adalbert class was a group of two armored cruisers built for the German Kaiserliche Marine (Imperial Navy) under the terms of the Second Naval Law. The two ships were heavily based on the previous armored cruiser, with a series of incremental improvements. Their armor layout was revised slightly to improve internal protection and their main battery consisted of four  guns instead of the two  carried by Prinz Heinrich. The new ships also received more powerful propulsion systems, making them slightly faster. Prinz Adalbert spent her peacetime career as a gunnery training ship while Friedrich Carl initially served as the flagship of the fleet's reconnaissance forces. By 1909, she had been replaced by more modern cruisers and joined Prinz Adalbert as a training vessel. 

Following the outbreak of World War I in July 1914, both vessels were mobilized; Friedrich Carl was assigned to the cruiser squadron in the Baltic Sea and was quickly sunk by Russian naval mines off Memel in November, though most of her crew was safely evacuated. Prinz Adalbert initially served in the North Sea, supporting the Raid on Yarmouth in November 1914 before transferring to the Baltic to replace her lost sister. Prinz Adalbert had little better luck, being torpedoed by British submarines twice in 1915, the first, in July, caused serious damage and necessitated lengthy repairs. The second, in October, caused an internal magazine explosion that destroyed the ship and killed almost her entire crew. Six-hundred and seventy-two men were killed, the greatest single loss of life for the German Navy in the Baltic during the war; there were only three survivors of her sinking.

Design

The First Naval Law in Germany, passed in 1898, envisioned a force of twelve armored cruisers intended for overseas service in the German colonies. However, the German Navy required cruisers for operations with the fleet as well, and attempted to design ships that could fulfill both roles, primarily due to budget constraints. The first product of the 1898 Naval Law, was an alteration of an earlier vessel, equipped with fewer guns and thinner but more comprehensive armor in a trade-off for higher speed and lower cost. According to the law, one large cruiser was to be built per year, so work began immediately on a follow-on vessel to fulfill the requirement. 

The subsequent design—that of the Prinz Adalbert class—was prepared in 1899–1900, and was an improvement on Prinz Heinrich. The basic hull size and shape remained largely identical, but modifications were made to the armament and armor layout. Four quick-firing  guns in twin turrets were substituted for the pair of slower  guns mounted singly on the older vessel, as the design staff had by that time begun to question the wisdom of limiting the heavy gun battery to just two guns. The 21 cm caliber would remain the standard for all subsequent armored cruiser designs. The ships' secondary battery was kept largely the same as that of Prinz Heinrich, apart from the addition of another pair of  guns.

Armor thickness remained similar in strength to that of Prinz Heinrich, though it was made more comprehensive, the primary improvement being to the upper belt, which was connected to the main battery barbettes by oblique armored bulkheads. The deck thickness was also increased, and a new propulsion system that was about 10 percent more powerful than Prinz Heinrichs increased the ships' top speed by  compared to the earlier vessel.

General characteristics

The ships' hulls were constructed from transverse and longitudinal steel frames, over which the steel hull plates were riveted. The vessels contained fourteen watertight compartments and a double bottom that extended for 60 percent of the length of the hull. The designers reverted to the use of two heavy military masts that had been discarded in Prinz Heinrichs design. 

The German navy regarded the vessels as good sea boats, with gentle motion when the ships' lower fuel bunkers were full. The ships were responsive to commands from the helm, and steering was controlled with a single rudder. They lost up to 60 percent speed with the rudder hard over, but suffered only minimal speed loss in heavy seas. The ships' casemate guns were placed too low, which rendered them exceedingly wet even in a slight swell. The ships had a standard crew of 35 officers and 551 enlisted men, though when serving as a squadron flagship this could be augmented by another 9 officers and 44 enlisted men. The ships were equipped with several boats, including a pair of picket boats, a launch, a pinnace, two cutters, two yawls, and two dinghies.

Prinz Adalbert and Friedrich Carl were powered by three vertical 3-cylinder triple expansion engines; the center shaft drove a three-bladed screw  in diameter, while the two outboard shafts powered four-bladed screws  in diameter. The engines were supplied with steam by fourteen coal-fired Dürr water-tube boilers produced by Düsseldorf-Ratinger Röhrenkesselfabrik, which were ducted into three funnels. Compared to those on earlier German cruisers, the propeller shafts were shortened and better faired into the hull lines to reduce the amount of drag they induced, and they were made self-supporting; these changes were incorporated into all future cruisers and battleships built by the Kaiserliche Marine.

Both ships reached higher horsepower figures on trials, though their speeds were not significantly improved.

Armament
Prinz Adalbert and Friedrich Carl were armed with a main battery of four  SK L/40 guns in two twin turrets, one on either end of the main superstructure. The four guns were supplied with a total of 340 rounds of ammunition, or 85 shells per gun. The ships' secondary armament consisted of ten  SK L/40 guns, all placed in the sides of the hulls. Three guns were mounted in casemates amidships on either side, with a pair of gun turrets above them. These guns were provided with a total of 1,400 shells, or 140 per gun.

The ships also carried twelve 8.8 cm SK L/35 guns for close in defense; these were arranged in groups of four in shielded pivot mounts. Four guns were mounted around the forward conning tower, four were located around the rear two funnels amidships, with the last four guns placed on top of the rear superstructure. The vessels' armament system was rounded out by four  submerged torpedo tubes. They were mounted in the bow, stern, and on each broadside, and supplied with eleven torpedoes.

Armor
The steel armor used on the two ships was produced by the Krupp firm. Sloped armor, which ranged in thickness from 50 to 80 mm, connected the deck to the armored belt. The ships' casemate guns, which were placed above the main belt, were protected by 100 mm thick armor plating, as were the 15 cm turret guns. The two 21 cm guns had 150 mm thick sides and 30 mm roofs. The rear conning tower was much less thoroughly protected, with only  worth of armor protection.

Ships

Service history
Prinz Adalbert went into service as a gunnery training vessel for the fleet after her commissioning, while Friedrich Carl served with the reconnaissance squadron of the Active Battle Fleet, initially as its flagship. Friedrich Carl also went on foreign cruises during this period, including to escort Kaiser Wilhelm II's yacht Hohenzollern on foreign visits. One of these included the Kaiser's visit to Morocco in 1905 that led to the First Moroccan Crisis. In 1909, with more modern cruisers entering service with the fleet, Friedrich Carl joined her sister ship as a training vessel, being used as a torpedo training ship. Throughout their prewar careers, the ships participated in extensive fleet training.

World War I

The two ships were re-mobilized after the outbreak of World War I in August 1914. Prinz Adalbert was initially assigned to the IV Scouting Group, and alternated between the North and Baltic Seas for various operations, including cruising with the fleet during the Raid on Yarmouth in early November. Friedrich Carl was sent to the Cruiser Division of the Baltic Sea commanded by Konteradmiral (Rear Admiral) Ehler Behring, where she served as his flagship. The division was based in Neufahrwasser in Danzig. Behring was ordered to attack the Russian port of Libau, which was believed to be acting as a staging area for British submarines. On 17 November, while steaming to Libau, Friedrich Carl struck a pair of Russian naval mines off Memel. The ship's crew managed to keep the cruiser afloat long enough to allow nearby vessels to take off the entire crew; only seven men were killed in the attack. The operation proceeded as planned, however, and several blockships were sunk in the harbor entrance.

After the sinking of Friedrich Carl, Prinz Adalbert was transferred to the Cruiser Division and Behring shifted his flag to the vessel. The ship conducted several operations against Russian forces in the southern Baltic in the first half of 1915, including bombardments of Libau and supporting minelayers around the Gulf of Riga. She ran aground off Steinort in January but was able to free herself. After repairs were completed, she returned to active duty in March. In May, she supported the German Army attack that captured Libau. On 1 July 1915, the ship sortied to reinforce a German minelaying operation that had come under attack by a Russian cruiser flotilla. While en route with the armored cruiser Prinz Heinrich, Prinz Adalbert was torpedoed by the British submarine . The damage was severe, though the cruiser was able to return to Kiel for repairs.

Repairs were finally completed by September 1915. She took part in a sortie into the Gulf of Finland toward the end of the month that resulted in no action. On 23 October, Prinz Adalbert was steaming some 20 miles west of Libau in company with a pair of destroyers when she was intercepted by the submarine . The explosion destroyed the ship, which sank immediately with the loss of 672 crew. There were only three survivors. The sinking was the greatest single loss of life for the German Baltic forces for the duration of the war.

Notes

Footnotes

Citations

References

Further reading
 

Cruiser classes
 
World War I cruisers of Germany